New Lower Bicutan is one of the 28 barangays of Taguig, Metro Manila, Philippines. It was created into a barangay under Taguig City Ordinance No. 24, Series 2008 and ratified on December 18, 2008. It is located in the south eastern part of the city and is bounded by the barangays of Hagonoy and Katuparan on the north, the Signal villages (North, Central and South) on the west, the barangays of Lower Bicutan and Maharlika on the south, and Laguna de Bay on the east. It was a former part of the barangay of Lower Bicutan.

References 

Taguig
Barangays of Metro Manila